Lupton is a linear village and civil parish in the South Lakeland district of Cumbria, England, along the main A65 road north west of Kirkby Lonsdale,  from the village of Hutton Roof. In the 2001 census the parish had a population of 165, decreasing slightly at the 2011 census to 162.

As well as All Saints Church, the village has a public house, the Plough. Lupton Tower is an 18th-century house now used as a corporate head office.

See also

Listed buildings in Lupton, Cumbria

References

External links 
 Cumbria County History Trust: Lupton (nb: provisional research only – see Talk page)

Villages in Cumbria
Civil parishes in Cumbria